Bawal is the second album of the Filipino rock band, Yano. It has 10 tracks and released under Alpha Records on August 10, 1996.

Track listing
 "Metro" – 2:25
 "Dayo"  – 4:15
 "Askal"  – 3:25
 "Bawal"  – 3:48
 "Lahat"  – 4:58
 "Ate"  – 2:59
 "Astig"  – 3:08
 "Sana"  – 5:07
 "Diosdiosan"  – 3:10
 "Pyutcha"  – 4:23

Personnel
 Dong Abay – 
 Eric Gancio – 
 Onie Badiang – 
 Nowie Favila –

References

External links
 http://websayt.com/cd/yano1.htm#start

1996 albums
Yano albums